An Hae-sook (born 1961) is a female former South Korean international table tennis player.

Table tennis career
She won a bronze medal in the women's doubles with Hwang Nam-sook at the 1981 World Table Tennis Championships  and a silver medal in the Corbillon Cup (women's team event) for South Korea.

See also
 List of table tennis players
 List of World Table Tennis Championships medalists

References

South Korean female table tennis players
1961 births
Living people
Asian Games medalists in table tennis
Table tennis players at the 1982 Asian Games
Medalists at the 1982 Asian Games
Asian Games silver medalists for South Korea
World Table Tennis Championships medalists